Frank Joseph McGuire (November 8, 1913 – October 11, 1994) was an American basketball coach. At the collegiate level, he was head coach for three major programs: St. John's, North Carolina, and South Carolina, winning over a hundred games at each.

Early years
Born in New York City as the youngest of 13 children in an Irish-American family, to New York police officer, Robert McGuire and his wife, the former Anne Lynch (his father died when Frank was only two years old). He attended Xavier High School graduating in 1933, McGuire graduated from St. John's University in 1936, playing under head coach James "Buck" Freeman. He served in the U.S. Navy during World War II, interrupting his work as a teacher and coach at his high school. Prior to 1947 he also played pro basketball briefly in the American Basketball League.

St. John's
After Joe Lapchick left St. John's to coach the New York Knicks in 1947, McGuire became head basketball and baseball coach at his alma mater.  He led the baseball team to the College World Series in 1949 and the basketball team to the Final Four in 1952 – becoming one of only three coaches to achieve both accomplishments.

North Carolina
In 1952, McGuire left St. John's to become basketball coach at the University of North Carolina.  On paper, this was a significant step down from St. John's, as UNC was not reckoned as a national power at the time.  However, school officials wanted a big-name coach to counter the rise of rival North Carolina State under Everett Case.

In his first season, McGuire briefly led the Tar Heels to their first appearance in a major poll, for two weeks in January and February 1953. After two middling seasons in the newly formed Atlantic Coast Conference, McGuire first made an impact in 1955, when his Tar Heels routed then-#5 Alabama 99-77. It was UNC's first defeat of a nonconference opponent ranked in the top 10 of a major media poll. They went on to share the ACC regular season title with N.C. State. A year later, McGuire guided North Carolina to an undefeated 32-0 season in 1956-57, capped off by winning the NCAA championship game 54-53 in triple overtime against the Wilt Chamberlain-led Kansas Jayhawks. McGuire's teams were built around a core of players from in and around New York City, such as Lennie Rosenbluth, Joe Quigg and Tommy Kearns.

In 1961, UNC was found guilty of major NCAA violations.  Combined with rumors of point shaving by some UNC players, this led Chancellor William Aycock to force McGuire's resignation after the season.  At McGuire's suggestion, Aycock named McGuire's top assistant, Dean Smith, as the new coach.

Philadelphia Warriors
Soon after leaving North Carolina, McGuire became the head coach of the NBA's Philadelphia Warriors and coached Chamberlain during the Warriors' last season in the city. During this season, Chamberlain set his all-time record for scoring average in a season, of 50.4 points per game; additionally, this was the season in which Chamberlain scored 100 points in a single game. The team moved to San Francisco in 1962 and McGuire resigned rather than go west with the team.

South Carolina
Following his one season in the NBA, McGuire worked for two years in public relations in New York before returning to college basketball as head coach at the University of South Carolina in 1964.  The Gamecocks achieved national prominence under McGuire in his sixth year, going undefeated in ACC play in 1970–one of only two times that an ACC team from the state of South Carolina has won a regular season title (the other being Clemson in 1990). The Gamecocks were denied an NCAA berth when they lost a controversial ACC championship game, in double overtime, to North Carolina State. In those days, only one team per conference was guaranteed a bid to the 25-team field. Ironically, the Gamecocks' home arena, Carolina Coliseum, hosted the NCAA East Regional that same year.  The Gamecocks' 25 wins in 1970 were the most in school history until Frank Martin's 2016 team also won 25 games (Martin's 2017 Gamecocks broke the record, with 26 wins).  McGuire's Gamecocks won the ACC tournament in 1971–to this day, the only ACC tourney title won by a school from the state of South Carolina.

The Gamecocks went independent in 1972, and McGuire would then go on to take the Gamecocks to three more NCAA Tournaments and two National Invitation Tournaments before being forced into retirement after the 1979-80 season. His 283 wins are by far the most in school history. The playing surface at the Gamecocks' former arena, Carolina Coliseum, is named Frank McGuire Arena in his honor. He is also an honorary brother of the Alpha Eta chapter of Phi Kappa Sigma at the University of South Carolina.

Legacy
McGuire holds the record for most victories in a season without a loss, together with Bobby Knight of the 1976 Indiana Hoosiers, at 32-0.

He achieved the number one ranking with both the University of North Carolina and South Carolina, and is one of five coaches--John Calipari, Larry Brown, Roy Williams and Rick Pitino are the others—to take two different schools to the NCAA Finals. He is one of 15 coaches, as of 2021, to take multiple schools to the Final Four. The others are: Roy Williams, Lute Olson, Jack Gardner, Forddy Anderson, Larry Brown, Eddie Sutton, John Calipari, Rick Pitino, Gene Bartow, Hugh Durham, Lou Henson, Bob Huggins, Kelvin Sampson, and Lee Rose.

McGuire was famous for using his New York City ties to enlist players to come south to play at UNC and USC, and was known as one of the top recruiters in the sport, frequently joking about how successful his New York City players, many of them Jewish and Catholic, were in Baptist-prevalent North Carolina and South Carolina.  McGuire recruited so many New York City players to UNC and USC that the talent pipeline from NYC to the Carolinas was commonly referred to as the McGuire New York City Railroad.

Players that he coached or successfully recruited at the two schools include Lennie Rosenbluth (UNC), Larry Brown (UNC), Donnie Walsh (UNC), Doug Moe (UNC), Billy Cunningham (UNC), Bobby Cremins (USC), John Roche (USC), Tom Owens (USC), Tom Riker (USC), Kevin Joyce (USC), Brian Winters (USC), Mike Dunleavy, Sr. (USC) and Alex English (USC).

After having been the first coach to take two different schools to the finals of the NCAA basketball tournament, in 1971 he became the second coach – joining Eddie Hickey – to take three different schools to the NCAA tournament. McGuire was elected to the Naismith Memorial Basketball Hall of Fame in 1977, and retired in 1980.

He is the winningest coach in South Carolina history, and is still the third-winningest coach in North Carolina history. He died in Columbia, South Carolina.

He is not related to Marquette coach Al McGuire, who was a coaching contemporary of his. However, he did coach both Al and his brother Dick McGuire at St. John's.

Head coaching record

College basketball

College baseball

See also
 List of NCAA Division I Men's Final Four appearances by coach

References

External links
 

1913 births
1994 deaths
American men's basketball coaches
American men's basketball players
American people of Irish descent
Basketball coaches from New York (state)
Basketball players from New York City
College men's basketball head coaches in the United States
Naismith Memorial Basketball Hall of Fame inductees
National Collegiate Basketball Hall of Fame inductees
North Carolina Tar Heels men's basketball coaches
Philadelphia Warriors head coaches
South Carolina Gamecocks men's basketball coaches
Sportspeople from Columbia, South Carolina
St. John's Red Storm baseball coaches
St. John's Red Storm baseball players
St. John's Red Storm men's basketball coaches
St. John's Red Storm men's basketball players
Basketball players from Columbia, South Carolina